Glenn Arthur Roush (January 25, 1934 – May 27, 2020) was an American politician who served in both chambers of the Montana Legislature.

Early life and education 
Roush was born in Helena, Montana and graduated from Cut Bank High School in Cut Bank, Montana in 1952. Roush attended Montana State University and served in the United States Army.

Career 
Roush worked for Montana Power Company (Northwestern Energy) and lived in Cut Bank, Montana with his wife and family. Roush served in the Montana House of Representatives from 1981 to 1984 and in the Montana Senate from 1999 to 2011 as a Democrat.

Death 
He died at the Montana Veterans Home in Columbia Falls, Montana.

Notes

1934 births
2020 deaths
People from Cut Bank, Montana
Politicians from Helena, Montana
Military personnel from Montana
Montana State University alumni
Democratic Party members of the Montana House of Representatives
Democratic Party Montana state senators